The men's 5000 metres event at the 1999 All-Africa Games was held at the Johannesburg Stadium.

Results

References

Athletics at the 1999 All-Africa Games